Bones and All (Original Score) is the score album to the 2022 film of the same name, directed by Luca Guadagnino and starring Taylor Russell and Timothée Chalamet. The film's score was composed by Trent Reznor and Atticus Ross and was released on November 18, 2022, on Reznor's label The Null Corporation. It features 23 score tracks, along with the original song, "(You Make Me Feel Like) Home". The score features acoustic music representing the Midwestern United States, and draws inspiration from classical Americana songs, that depicts the relationship between the leading characters, despite the horror setting.

Background 
The film was Reznor and Ross' first collaboration with Luca Guadagnino. The pair were "spellbound by how he had taken this material and infused humanity, vulnerability and life into this, which was breathtaking" and "felt like it doesn’t even need music". Both Reznor and Ross had discussed extensively regarding the score, where Guadagnino stated that he wanted it to be "a melancholic elegy, an unending longing. It needs to be a character in the film, a part of the landscape". Ross added, "When the film opens, there’s the element of the love themes that the characters haven’t found themselves, but as the story progresses, it becomes more intense and intertwined. But within that journey, as their love progresses, we managed to figure out a way where the eating theme could work and intertwine in the same way the story does."

Guadagnino requested the use of acoustic guitars to complement the Americana visuals, while Ross felt that they knew that guitar will be "the central element of the music". Reznor and Ross noted that they experiment with a lot of different sounds before figuring out how the score will sit in the film. Reznor and Ross wrote the original song "(You Make Me Feel Like) Home", with Ross saying, "I can say that I think it’s devastating when that song comes in [...] I know I can speak for us both when I say we fell in love with those characters and with that particular moment with those particular lyrics, the imagery and the sparseness." The song stemmed from their personal connections to Russell and Chalamet's characters. Ross described, "That doesn’t happen all the time. But over the period of the six, eight or 10 months that you’re working every day watching these people, you’re breathing life into scenarios they’re in with the music that you’re using to help tell their story."

Initially, the duo composed around 10 pieces for the film before seeing the rough cut, but when they saw the full film, "[our] minds were blown, the transformation of the written page into living, breathing characters filled with vulnerabilities. And the beauty of his camera work and the set design and the sense of place and just the sadness of the story came into full focus for us, and we were off to the races." Reznor and Ross completed scoring the film in May 2022, after working for nearly eight months.

Track listing

Additional music 
In addition to the original score, the non-album songs featured in the film are: "Everything I Need" by Men at Work, "Save a Prayer" by Duran Duran, “Cadillac Encounter” by The Mears Brothers”, "Lick It Up" by Kiss, "Amarillo by Morning" by George Strait, "Your Silent Face" by New Order, "Atmosphere" by Joy Division, "The Sun Always Shines on T.V." by a-ha and "Obsession" by Animotion.

Charts

Accolades

References 

2022 soundtrack albums
Trent Reznor soundtracks
Atticus Ross soundtracks
The Null Corporation soundtracks
Albums produced by Trent Reznor
Albums produced by Atticus Ross